Adebimpe may refer to:
Tunde Adebimpe (born 1975), American musician, singer-songwriter, actor, director, and visual artist
Adebimpe Oyebade (born 1997), Nigerian film actress
Nigerian feminine given names